Okongo is a constituency in the Ohangwena Region of Namibia, on the border to Angola. It had about 18,000 inhabitants in 2011 and 12,562 registered voters .

The main settlement and district capital is Okongo. The constituency is sharing boundaries with Angola on the North, Oshikoto region on the South, Kavango West on the Eastern part, and Oshikunde on the West.

Politics
As is common in all constituencies of former Owamboland, Namibia's ruling SWAPO Party has dominated elections since independence.

It won the 2015 regional election by a landslide. Its candidate Fanuel Ndadi gathered 5,766 votes, while the only opposition candidate, Waldeheim Kanalelo of the Rally for Democracy and Progress (RDP), received 241 votes. The 2020 regional election was also won by the SWAPO candidate. Efraim Lebeus received 5,072 votes, far ahead of Tobias Shingo of the Independent Patriots for Change (IPC), an opposition party formed in August 2020, who obtained 469 votes.

Population
Okongo Constituency had 21,321 inhabitants in 2004. The 2011 National Housing Population Census counted 17 999 inhabitants and 3601 households which make up to 8.24% of the total number of households in the region. Roughly 70% of the households in the constituency use water from wells and boreholes.

References 

Constituencies of Ohangwena Region
States and territories established in 1992
1992 establishments in Namibia